William Carter Love (1784December 3, 1824) was a Congressional Representative from North Carolina; born near Norfolk, Virginia, in 1784; moved to Chapel Hill, North Carolina; was tutored at home; attended the University of North Carolina at Chapel Hill 1802–1804; studied law; was admitted to the bar and commenced practice in Salisbury, North Carolina, in 1806; elected as a Democratic-Republican to the Fourteenth Congress (March 4, 1815 – March 3, 1817); resumed the practice of law in Salisbury, Rowan County, N.C., where he died in 1824; interment in a private cemetery in Salisbury.

See also 
 Fourteenth United States Congress

External links 
 U.S. Congress Biographical Directory entry

People from Chapel Hill, North Carolina
1784 births
1824 deaths
Democratic-Republican Party members of the United States House of Representatives from North Carolina
19th-century American politicians